The Francis Howell School District has provided education in St. Charles County, Missouri since 1830. Through mergers, it became the Consolidated School District No. 2 of St. Charles County in 1913, and the Francis Howell Reorganized School District #3 in 1951. Population growth in the 1970s and 1980s, and continued into the 1990s. In the last five years student enrollment growth has shown a slight decline from year to year. While annual fluctuations in growth rates are likely, enrollment projections indicate that student population during the next five years will continue its slow and gradual decline. Enrollment is expected to level off at approximately 17,000 students. The District currently provides education to approximately 18,000 students preschool through twelfth grade, and an additional 8,000 students in its early childhood education programs.

The cities within the District’s boundaries including St. Peters, Cottleville, Weldon Spring, Harvester, southern portions of St. Charles City, and eastern portions of O’Fallon. The District’s educational facilities include ten elementary, five middle and three high schools; three early childhood centers, and two alternative education schools.

The District was featured on the 2015 Jul 31 episode of This American Life. In 2013, the Missouri Supreme Court upheld a law that allowed students attending unaccredited school districts to transfer to other schools. A lawful decision was made that students from the neighboring Normandy School District would be able to attend schools within the Francis Howell School District. This led to Francis Howell district parents voicing concerns against the transfer of students even though they would pay out-of-district tuition. The town hall meeting went on for over two hours with almost 3,000 people in attendance. One parent stated : “I deserve to not have to worry about my children getting stabbed, or taking a drug, or getting robbed." Many of these parents were later criticized by some as a result of these remarks. Other parents drew similarities between their current controversy and that of desegregation busing during the Civil Rights Movement.

In 2014, the Francis Howell School District decided to no longer take out-of-district tuition and the Missouri State Board of Education to reconstitute the Normandy District as the Normandy Schools Collaborative and eliminate its “unaccredited” status.

Francis Howell School District Superintendent: Dr. Nathan Hoven

Schools

Elementary schools and locations 

 Becky David Elementary School (St. Peters)
 Castilo Elementary School (St. Peters)
 Central Elementary School (St. Peters)
 Fairmount Elementary School (St. Peters)
 Henderson Elementary School (St. Peters)
 Daniel Boone Elementary School (New Melle)
 Harvest Ridge Elementary School (St. Charles)
 Independence Elementary School (Weldon Spring)
 John Weldon Elementary School (Dardenne Prairie)
 Warren Elementary School (Cottleville)
 Westwood Trail Academy (Alternative School, Weldon Spring)

Middle schools and locations 

 Barnwell Middle School (St. Peters)
 Hollenbeck Middle School (St. Peters)
 Bryan Middle School (Weldon Spring)
 Francis Howell Middle School (Weldon Spring)
 Saeger Middle School (Cottleville)
 Westwood Trail Academy (Alternative School, Weldon Spring)

High schools and locations 

 Francis Howell High School (Weldon Spring)
 Francis Howell Central High School (Cottleville)
 Francis Howell North High School (St. Peters)
 Francis Howell Union High School (Alternative School, Weldon Spring)
 Westwood Trail Academy (Alternative School, Weldon Spring)

References

External links
 District Website

School districts in Missouri
Education in St. Charles County, Missouri
1830 establishments in Missouri
School districts established in 1830